Yoo Seong-min (born 7 January 1958), also known as Yoo Seung-min, is a South Korean economist and politician. Yoo is former a member of the Korean Parliament and was the Bareun Party's presidential nominee in the 2017 South Korean presidential election. He is the son of late Daegu court chief, attorney and Member of Parliament, Yoo Soo-ho for Junggu of Daegu.

Early life 
Yoo was born in Daegu, and was the youngest child. His father was a farmer, but then became a judge and had been in politics for 8 years between 1985 and 1993. Yoo obtained his B.A. in Economics from Seoul National University in 1982, and his Ph.D. in Economics from the University of Wisconsin–Madison in 1987. His focus was in industrial organization with a minor in economic theory and mathematical economics/econometrics. Yoo's Ph.D. dissertation is titled "Entry Into a Foreign Market: Theory and Evidence" and was supervised under Rachel McCulloch.

After graduation Yoo worked as an economist at the Korea Development Institute (KDI) from 1987 to 2000. He then worked as President of the Youido Institute, a think-tank for then Hannara (now Liberty Korea) Party from 2000 to 2003.

Hannara/Saenuri Party

Early political career 
He was first elected as member of the National Assembly in 2004 as a member of the conservative Hannara Party as part of the proportional representation ticket. Yoo also served as Chief of Staff to future President and then-lawmaker/Chairman of the Hannara Party Park Geun-hye in 2005. He was considered her close aide. He went onto be elected three more times representing parts of Daegu.

Yoo was the floor leader for the Saenuri Party (renamed from Hannara) in the National Assembly, resigning from the position in July 2015.

Anti-Park faction 
Yoo and Park Geun-hye reportedly grew apart following Park's loss in the presidential nomination process to Lee Myung-bak in the primary of the 2007 presidential election.

Following greater separation from Park in 2007, as well as his open critical comments of President Park's policies such as opposing the President's promise to expand welfare without increasing taxes, Yoo was deselected from his party's nomination process in for the 2016 general election. President Park called Yoo to be engaging in a "politics of betrayal." He stood as an independent in the 2016 election and managed to win with nearly three quarters of the vote. He stated after the election in interview that he would return to the Saenuri Party and did so.

Yoo was a notable member of the party for his previously close support for Park Geun-hye but later split from the pro-Park faction of the party. This contributed to his eventually founding of the splinter conservative party Bareun Party during President Park's political scandal.

Bareun Party 
Yoo went onto help form, and joined, the political group New Conservative Party for Reform (later permanently renamed the Bareun Party) during the 2016 South Korean political scandal. Bareun Party had enough defectors to become the fourth largest party in the National Assembly, with Yoo subsequently presented as "Candidate #4" in the 2017 presidential election.

2017 presidential campaign

Party nomination 
Yoo had run for the 2017 South Korean presidential election. Yoo faced a primary challenge against Nam Kyung-pil to be his party's nominee, but went onto win the presidential nomination of the Bareun Party on March 28, 2017.

Campaign platform 
His campaign platform has been conservative on foreign policy (안보는 보수 - "maintaining national security") while calling for reforms on the South Korean economy (경제는 개혁 - "reforming the economy"). Yoo emphasizes "warm conservatism," which calls for reforms in the economy to provide what he brands himself to be true conservatism. This is in contrast to pro-Park Geun-hye faction in Korean conservative policies, which was the faction the Bareun Party split itself from and is currently known as the Liberty Korea Party.

Defection of Bareun Party members 
About a week prior to the presidential election, 13 members of the Bareun party announced they would be defecting back to the Liberty Korea Party reasoning they should back one conservative candidate in the five-candidate field. One lawmaker, Hwang Young-cheul, reversed his decision the next day. The result of this defection helped boost Yoo's polling numbers.

Results 
Yoo finished fourth in the election, with his best results in his home area of Daegu.

Personal life 
He has an elder brother and an elder sister. He and his wife have two adult children, a son (born 1982) and a daughter (born 1994).

Political philosophy 
He is considered one of the leading politicians who advocate moderate conservative factors. 

In a lecture at Sungkyunkwan University on the theme of "economic crisis and the role of politics," Yoo said a "conservative revolution" aimed at warm, just conservatism based on Republican ideology is needed in an era of despair. 

On republicanism, Yoo defined it as "a political order in which citizens enjoy freedom and practice civil virtue without subjugation to other citizens within the control of the law that guarantees public good." It also stressed aspects of public interests that the state and its citizens should pursue, saying that "the most important value in the republic is justice."

Notes

References

1958 births
Living people
Seoul National University alumni
University of Wisconsin–Madison College of Letters and Science alumni
Members of the National Assembly (South Korea)
Liberty Korea Party politicians
Bareun Party politicians
Conservatism in South Korea
People from Daegu
Gangneung Yoo clan
South Korean Buddhists
Republicanism in Korea